Evan Bird is a Canadian actor. He is best known for playing Benjie Weiss in the film Maps to the Stars and Tom Larsen in the American crime drama series The Killing.

Career
Bird was named by Indiewire as one of the best actors under the age of twenty.

Filmography

FilmsChained (2012)Maps to the Stars (2014)

TelevisionFringe, Season 4, episode 3, "Alone in the World" (2011)The Killing'' (2011-2012)

References

External links
 

2000 births
Living people
Male actors from Vancouver
Canadian male film actors
Canadian male television actors
Canadian male child actors
21st-century Canadian male actors